Stefan Zweig (28 November 1881 – 22 February 1942) was an Austrian novelist, playwright, journalist, and biographer. At the height of his literary career, in the 1920s and 1930s, he was one of the most widely translated and popular writers in the world.

Zweig was raised in Vienna, Austria-Hungary. He wrote historical studies of famous literary figures, such as Honoré de Balzac, Charles Dickens, and Fyodor Dostoevsky in Drei Meister (1920; Three Masters), and decisive historical events in Decisive Moments in History (1927). He wrote biographies of Joseph Fouché (1929), Mary Stuart (1935) and Marie Antoinette (Marie Antoinette: The Portrait of an Average Woman, 1932), among others. Zweig's best-known fiction includes Letter from an Unknown Woman (1922), Amok (1922), Fear (1925), Confusion of Feelings (1927), Twenty-Four Hours in the Life of a Woman (1927), the psychological novel Ungeduld des Herzens (Beware of Pity, 1939), and The Royal Game (1941).

In 1934, as a result of the Nazi Party's rise in Germany, Zweig emigrated to England and then, in 1940, moved briefly to New York and then to Brazil, where he settled. In his final years, he would declare himself in love with the country, writing about it in the book Brazil, Land of the Future. Nonetheless, as the years passed Zweig became increasingly disillusioned and despairing at the future of Europe, and he and his wife Lotte were found dead of a barbiturate overdose in their house in Petrópolis on 23 February 1942; they had died the previous day. His work has been the basis for several film adaptations. Zweig's memoir, Die Welt von Gestern (The World of Yesterday, 1942), is noted for its description of life during the waning years of the Austro-Hungarian Empire under Franz Joseph I and has been called the most famous book on the Habsburg Empire.

Biography 

Zweig was born in Vienna, the son of Ida Brettauer (1854–1938), a daughter of a Jewish banking family, and Moritz Zweig (1845–1926), a wealthy Jewish textile manufacturer. He was related to the Czech writer Egon Hostovský, who described him as "a very distant relative"; some sources describe them as cousins.

Zweig studied philosophy at the University of Vienna and in 1904 earned a doctoral degree with a thesis on "The Philosophy of Hippolyte Taine". Religion did not play a central role in his education. "My mother and father were Jewish only through accident of birth", Zweig said in an interview. Yet he did not renounce his Jewish faith and wrote repeatedly on Jews and Jewish themes, as in his story Buchmendel. Zweig had a warm relationship with Theodor Herzl, the founder of Zionism, whom he met when Herzl was still literary editor of the Neue Freie Presse, then Vienna's main newspaper; Herzl accepted for publication some of Zweig's early essays. Zweig, a committed cosmopolitan, believed in internationalism and in Europeanism, as The World of Yesterday, his autobiography, makes clear: "I was sure in my heart from the first of my identity as a citizen of the world." According to Amos Elon, Zweig called Herzl's book Der Judenstaat an "obtuse text, [a] piece of nonsense".

Zweig served in the Archives of the Ministry of War and adopted a pacifist stance like his friend Romain Rolland, recipient of the Nobel Prize in Literature 1915. Zweig married Friderike Maria von Winternitz (born Burger) in 1920; they divorced in 1938. As Friderike Zweig she published a book on her former husband after his death. She later also published a picture book on Zweig. In the late summer of 1939, Zweig married his secretary Elisabet Charlotte "Lotte" Altmann in Bath, England. Zweig's secretary in Salzburg from November 1919 to March 1938 was Anna Meingast (13 May 1881, Vienna – 17 November 1953, Salzburg).

As a Jew, Zweig's high profile did not shield him from the threat of persecution. In 1934, following Hitler's rise to power in Germany, Zweig left Austria for England, living first in London, then from 1939 in Bath. Because of the swift advance of Hitler's troops westwards, and the threat of arrest or worse – as part of the preparations for Operation Seelöwe a list of persons to be detained immediately after conquest of the British Isles, the so-called Black Book, had been assembled and Zweig was on page 231, with his London address fully mentioned – Zweig and his second wife crossed the Atlantic to the United States, settling in 1940 in New York City; they lived for two months as guests of Yale University in New Haven, Connecticut, then they rented a house in Ossining, New York.

On 22 August 1940, they moved again to Petrópolis, a German-colonized mountain town 68 kilometres north of Rio de Janeiro. Zweig, feeling increasingly depressed about the situation in Europe and the future for humanity, wrote in a letter to author Jules Romains, "My inner crisis consists in that I am not able to identify myself with the me of passport, the self of exile". On 23 February 1942, the Zweigs were found dead of a barbiturate overdose in their house in the city of Petrópolis, holding hands. He had been despairing at the future of Europe and its culture. "I think it better to conclude in good time and in erect bearing a life in which intellectual labour meant the purest joy and personal freedom the highest good on Earth", he wrote.

The Zweigs' house in Brazil was later turned into a cultural centre and is now known as Casa Stefan Zweig.

Work 
Zweig was a prominent writer in the 1920s and 1930s, befriending Arthur Schnitzler and Sigmund Freud. He was extremely popular in the United States, South America and Europe, and remains so in continental Europe; however, he was largely ignored by the British public. His fame in America had diminished until the 1990s, when there began an effort on the part of several publishers (notably Pushkin Press, Hesperus Press, and The New York Review of Books) to get Zweig back into print in English. Plunkett Lake Press has reissued electronic versions of his non-fiction works. Since that time there has been a marked resurgence and a number of Zweig's books are back in print.

Critical opinion of his oeuvre is strongly divided between those who praise his humanism, simplicity and effective style, and those who criticize his literary style as poor, lightweight and superficial. German polemicist Michael Hofmann scathingly attacks Zweig's work. Hofmann uses the term "vermicular dither” to refer to a passage attributed to Zweig and quoted in 1972 ; however the passage does not occur in Zweig's published work. Hofmann adds that in his opinion "Zweig just tastes fake. He's the Pepsi of Austrian writing." Even the author's suicide note, Hofmann suggests, causes one to feel "the irritable rise of boredom halfway through it, and the sense that he doesn't mean it, his heart isn't in it (not even in his suicide)".. Similarly Paul Morand gleefully notes the declining fame of Zweig's works among the names of Emil Ludwig and André Maurois, "those one-price products of Jewish know-how".

Zweig is best known for his novellas (notably The Royal Game, Amok, and Letter from an Unknown Woman – which was filmed in 1948 by Max Ophüls), novels (Beware of Pity, Confusion of Feelings, and the posthumously published The Post Office Girl) and biographies (notably of Erasmus of Rotterdam, Ferdinand Magellan, and Mary, Queen of Scots, and also the posthumously published one on Balzac). At one time his works were published without his consent in English under the pseudonym "Stephen Branch" (a translation of his real name) when anti-German sentiment was running high. His 1932 biography of Queen Marie Antoinette was adapted by Metro-Goldwyn-Mayer as a 1938 film starring Norma Shearer.

Zweig's memoir, The World of Yesterday, was completed in 1942 one day before he died by suicide. It has been widely discussed as a record of "what it meant to be alive between 1881 and 1942" in central Europe; the book has attracted both critical praise and hostile dismissal.

Zweig acknowledged his debt to psychoanalysis. In a letter dated 8 September 1926, he wrote to Freud, "Psychology is the great business of my life". He went on explaining that Freud had considerable influence on writers such as Marcel Proust, D.H. Lawrence and James Joyce, giving them a lesson in "courage" and helping them to overcome their inhibitions. "Thanks to you, we see many things. – Thanks to you we say many things which otherwise we would not have seen nor said." He claimed autobiography, in particular, had become "more clear-sighted and audacious".

Zweig enjoyed a close association with Richard Strauss and provided the libretto for Die schweigsame Frau (The Silent Woman). Strauss famously defied the Nazi regime by refusing to sanction the removal of Zweig's name from the programme for the work's première on 24 June 1935 in Dresden. As a result, Goebbels refused to attend as planned, and the opera was banned after three performances. Zweig later collaborated with Joseph Gregor to provide Strauss with the libretto for one other opera, Daphne, in 1937. At least one other work by Zweig received a musical setting: the pianist and composer Henry Jolles, who like Zweig had fled to Brazil to escape the Nazis, composed a song, "Último poema de Stefan Zweig", based on "Letztes Gedicht", which Zweig wrote on the occasion of his 60th birthday in November 1941. During his stay in Brazil, Zweig wrote Brasilien, Ein Land der Zukunft (Brazil, A Land of the Future) which consisted in a collection of essays on the history and culture of his newly adopted country.

Zweig was a passionate collector of manuscripts. He corresponded at length with Hungarian musicologist Gisela Selden-Goth, often discussing their mutual interest in collecting original music scores. There are important Zweig collections at the British Library, at the State University of New York at Fredonia and at the National Library of Israel. The British Library's Stefan Zweig Collection was donated to the library by his heirs in May 1986. It specialises in autograph music manuscripts, including works by Bach, Haydn, Wagner, and Mahler. It has been described as "one of the world's greatest collections of autograph manuscripts". One particularly precious item is Mozart's "Verzeichnüß aller meiner Werke" – that is, the composer's own handwritten thematic catalogue of his works.

The 1993–1994 academic year at the College of Europe was named in his honour.

Zweig has been credited with being one of the novelists who contributed to the emergence of what would later be called the Habsburg Myth.

Bibliography 

The dates mentioned below are the dates of first publication in German.

Fiction 
 Forgotten Dreams, 1900 (Original title: Vergessene Träume)
 Spring in the Prater, 1900 (Original title: Praterfrühling)
 A Loser, 1901 (Original title: Ein Verbummelter)
 In the Snow, 1901 (Original title: Im Schnee)
 Two Lonely Souls, 1901 (Original title: Zwei Einsame)
 The Miracles of Life, 1903 (Original title: Die Wunder des Lebens)
 The Love of Erika Ewald, 1904 (Original title: Die Liebe der Erika Ewald)
 The Star Over the Forest, 1904 (Original title: Der Stern über dem Walde)
 The Fowler Snared, 1906 (Original title: Sommernovellette)
 The Governess, 1907 (Original title: Die Governante)
 Scarlet Fever, 1908 (Original title: Scharlach)
 Twilight, 1910 (Original title: Geschichte eines Unterganges)
 A Story Told In Twilight, 1911, short story (Original title: Geschichte in der Dämmerung)
 Burning Secret, 1913
 Fear, 1920 (Original title: Angst)
 Compulsion, 1920 (Original title: Der Zwang)
 Fantastic Night, 1922 (Original title: Phantastische Nacht)
 Letter from an Unknown Woman, 1922 (Original title: Brief einer Unbekannten)
 Moonbeam Alley, 1922 (Original title: Die Mondscheingasse)
 Amok, 1922 (Original title: Amok) – novella, initially published with several others in Amok. Novellen einer Leidenschaft
 The Invisible Collection, 1925 (Original title: Die unsichtbare Sammlung)
 Downfall of the Heart, 1927 (Original title: Untergang eines Herzens)
 The Invisible Collection see Collected Stories below, (Original title: Die Unsichtbare Sammlung, first published in book form in 'Insel-Almanach auf das Jahr 1927')
 The Refugee, 1927 (Original title: Der Flüchtling. Episode vom Genfer See).
 Confusion of Feelings or Confusion: The Private Papers of Privy Councillor R Von D, 1927 (Original title: Verwirrung der Gefühle) – novella initially published in the volume Verwirrung der Gefühle: Drei Novellen
 Twenty-Four Hours in the Life of a Woman, 1927 (Original title: Vierundzwanzig Stunden aus dem Leben einer Frau) – novella initially published in the volume Verwirrung der Gefühle: Drei Novellen
 Widerstand der Wirklichkeit, 1929 (in English as Journey into the Past (1976))
 Buchmendel, 1929 (Original title: Buchmendel))
 Short stories, 1930 (Original title: Kleine Chronik. Vier Erzählungen) – includes Buchmendel
 Did He Do It?, published between 1935 and 1940 (Original title: War er es?)
 Leporella, 1935 (Original title: Leporella)
 Collected Stories, 1936 (Original title: Gesammelte Erzählungen) – two volumes of short stories:1. The Chains (Original title: Die Kette)2. Kaleidoscope (Original title: Kaleidoskop). Includes: Casual Knowledge of a Craft, Leporella, Fear, Burning Secret, Summer Novella, The Governess, Buchmendel, The Refugee, The Invisible Collection, Fantastic Night, and Moonbeam Alley. Kaleidoscope: thirteen stories and novelettes, published by The Viking Press in 1934, includes some of those just listed — some with differently translated titles — plus others.
 Incident on Lake Geneva, 1936 (Original title: Episode am Genfer See Revised version of "Der Flüchtung. Episode vom Genfer See", published in 1927)
 The Old-Book Peddler and Other Tales for Bibliophiles, 1937, four pieces (two "clothed in the form of fiction," according to the preface by translator Theodore W. Koch), published by Northwestern University, The Charles Deering Library, Evanston, Illinois:
 "Books are the Gateway to the World"
 "The Old-Book Peddler; A Viennese Tale for Bibliophiles" (Original title: Buchmendel)
 "The Invisible Collection; An Episode from the Post-War Inflation Period" (Original title: Die unsichtbare Sammlung)
 "Thanks to Books"
 Beware of Pity, 1939 (Original title: Ungeduld des Herzens) novel
 Legends, a collection of five short stories published in 1945 (Original title: Legenden – published also as Jewish Legends with "Buchmendel" instead of "The Dissimilar Doubles":
 "Rachel Arraigns with God", 1930 (Original title: "Rahel rechtet mit Gott"
 "The Eyes of My Brother, Forever", 1922 (Original title: "Die Augen des ewigen Bruders")
 "The Buried Candelabrum", 1936 (Original title: "Der begrabene Leuchter")
 "The Legend of The Third Dove", 1945 (Original title: "Die Legende der dritten Taube")
 "The Dissimilar Doubles", 1927 (Original title: "Kleine Legende von den gleich-ungleichen Schwestern")
 The Royal Game or Chess Story or Chess (Original title: Schachnovelle; Buenos Aires, 1942) – novella written in 1938–41,
 Clarissa, 1981 unfinished novel
 The Debt Paid Late, 1982 (Original title: Die spät bezahlte Schuld)
 The Post Office Girl, 1982 (Original title: Rausch der Verwandlung. Roman aus dem Nachlaß; The Intoxication of Metamorphosis)
 Schneewinter: 50 zeitlose Gedichte, 2016, editor Martin Werhand. Melsbach, Martin Werhand Verlag 2016

Biographies and historical texts 
 Émile Verhaeren (the Belgian poet), 1910
 Three Masters: Balzac, Dickens, Dostoevsky, 1920 (Original title: Drei Meister. Balzac – Dickens – Dostojewski. Translated into English by Eden and Cedar Paul and published in 1930 as Three Masters)
 Romain Rolland: The Man and His Work, 1921 (Original title: Romain Rolland. Der Mann und das Werk)
 Nietzsche, 1925 (Originally published in the volume titled: Der Kampf mit dem Dämon. Hölderlin – Kleist – Nietzsche)
 Decisive Moments in History, 1927 (Original title: Sternstunden der Menschheit). Translated into English and published in 1940 as The Tide of Fortune: Twelve Historical Miniatures; retranslated in 2013 by Anthea Bell as Shooting Stars: Ten Historical Miniatures 
 Adepts in Self-Portraiture: Casanova, Stendhal, Tolstoy, 1928 (Original title: Drei Dichter ihres Lebens. Casanova – Stendhal – Tolstoi)
 Joseph Fouché, 1929 (Original title: Joseph Fouché. Bildnis eines politischen Menschen)
 Mental Healers: Franz Mesmer, Mary Baker Eddy, Sigmund Freud, 1932 (Original title: Die Heilung durch den Geist. Mesmer, Mary Baker-Eddy, Freud)
 Marie Antoinette: The Portrait of an Average Woman, 1932 (Original title: Marie Antoinette. Bildnis eines mittleren Charakters) 
 Erasmus of Rotterdam, 1934 (Original title: Triumph und Tragik des Erasmus von Rotterdam)
 Maria Stuart, 1935 (also published as: The Queen of Scots or Mary Queen of Scots) 
 The Right to Heresy: Castellio against Calvin, 1936 (Original title: Castellio gegen Calvin oder Ein Gewissen gegen die Gewalt)
 Conqueror of the Seas: The Story of Magellan, 1938 (Original title: Magellan. Der Mann und seine Tat) 
 Montaigne, 1941 
 Amerigo, 1942 (Original title: Amerigo. Geschichte eines historischen Irrtums) – written in 1942, published the day before he died 
 Balzac, 1946 – written, as  describes in a postscript, by Zweig in the Brazilian summer capital of Petrópolis, without access to the files, notebooks, lists, tables, editions and monographs that Zweig accumulated for many years and that he took with him to Bath, but that he left behind when he went to America. Friedenthal wrote that Balzac "was to be his magnum opus, and he had been working at it for ten years. It was to be a summing up of his own experience as an author and of what life had taught him." Friedenthal claimed that "The book had been finished", though not every chapter was complete; he used a working copy of the manuscript Zweig left behind him to apply "the finishing touches", and Friedenthal rewrote the final chapters (Balzac, translated by William and Dorothy Rose [New York: Viking, 1946], pp. 399, 402).
 Paul Verlaine, Copyright 1913, By L.E. Basset Boston, Mass., USA. authorized English translation by O.F. Theis. Luce and Company Boston. Maunsel and Co. Ltd Dublin and London.

Plays 
 Tersites, 1907
 Das Haus am Meer, 1912
 Jeremiah, 1917
 Ben Jonson's Volpone. A Loveless Comedy in 3 Acts, freely adapted, 1928

Other 
 The World of Yesterday (Original title: Die Welt von Gestern; Stockholm, 1942) – autobiography
 Brazil, Land of the Future (Original title: Brasilien. Ein Land der Zukunft; Bermann-Fischer, Stockholm 1941)
 Journeys (Original title: Auf Reisen; Zurich, 1976); collection of essays
 Encounters and Destinies: A Farewell to Europe (2020); collection of essays

Letters

Adaptations 
Letter from an Unknown Woman was filmed in 1948 by Max Ophüls.

Beware of Pity was adapted into a 1946 film with the same title, directed by Maurice Elvey.

An adaptation by Stephen Wyatt of Beware of Pity was broadcast by BBC Radio 4 in 2011.

The 2012 Brazilian film The Invisible Collection, directed by Bernard Attal, is based on Zweig's short story of the same title.

The 2013 French film A Promise is based on Zweig's novella Journey into the Past.

The 2013 Swiss film Mary Queen of Scots directed by Thomas Imbach is based on Zweig's Maria Stuart.

The end-credits for Wes Anderson's 2014 film The Grand Budapest Hotel say that the film was inspired in part by Zweig's novels. Anderson said that he had "stolen" from Zweig's novels Beware of Pity and The Post-Office Girl in writing the film, and it features actors Tom Wilkinson as The Author, a character based loosely on Zweig, and Jude Law as his younger, idealised self seen in flashbacks. Anderson also said that the film's protagonist, the concierge Gustave H., played by Ralph Fiennes, was based on Zweig. In the film's opening sequence, a teenage girl visits a shrine for The Author, which includes a bust of him wearing Zweig-like spectacles and celebrated as his country's "National Treasure".

The 2017 Austrian-German-French film Vor der Morgenröte (Stefan Zweig: Farewell to Europe) chronicles Stefan Zweig's travels in the North and South Americas, trying to come to terms with his exile from home.

The 2018 American short film Crepúsculo by Clemy Clarke is based on Zweig's short story "A Story Told in Twilight" and relocated to a quinceañera in 1980s New York.

TV film La Ruelle au clair de lune (1988) by Édouard Molinaro is an adaptation of Zweig's short-story Moonbeam Alley.

See also 
 Le Mondes 100 Books of the Century, a list which includes Confusion of Feelings

References

Further reading 
 Elizabeth Allday, Stefan Zweig: A Critical Biography, J. Philip O'Hara, Inc., Chicago, 1972 
 
 Alberto Dines, Morte no Paraíso, a Tragédia de Stefan Zweig, Editora Nova Fronteira 1981, (rev. ed.) Editora Rocco 2004
 Alberto Dines, Tod im Paradies. Die Tragödie des Stefan Zweig, Edition Büchergilde, 2006
 Randolph J. Klawiter, Stefan Zweig. An International Bibliography, Ariadne Press, Riverside, 1991 
 Martin Mauthner, German Writers in French Exile, 1933–1940, Vallentine Mitchell, London 2007, 
 Oliver Matuschek, Three Lives: A Biography of Stefan Zweig, translated by Allan Blunden, Pushkin Press, 2011 
 Donald A. Prater, European of Yesterday: A Biography of Stefan Zweig, Holes and Meier, (rev. ed.) 2003 
 George Prochnik, The Impossible Exile: Stefan Zweig at the End of the World, Random House, 2014, 
 Giorgia Sogos, Le Biografie di Stefan Zweig tra Geschichte e Psychologie: Triumph und Tragik des Erasmus von Rotterdam, Marie Antoinette, Maria Stuart, Firenze University Press, 2013 
 Giorgia Sogos, Ein Europäer in Brasilien zwischen Vergangenheit und Zukunft. Utopische Projektionen des Exilanten Stefan Zweig, in: Lydia Schmuck, Marina Corrêa (Hrsg.): Europa im Spiegel von Migration und Exil / Europa no contexto de migração e exílio. Projektionen – Imaginationen – Hybride Identitäten/Projecções – Imaginações – Identidades híbridas, Frank & Timme Verlag, Berlin, 2015 
 Giorgia Sogos, Stefan Zweig, der Kosmopolit. Studiensammlung über seine Werke und andere Beiträge. Eine kritische Analyse, Free Pen Verlag, Bonn, 2017 
 Giorgia Sogos Wiquel, L’esilio impossibile. Stefan Zweig alla fine del mondo, in: Toscana Ebraica. Bimestrale di notizie e cultura ebraica. Anno 34, n. 6. Firenze: Novembre-Dicembre 2021, Cheshwan – Kislew- Tevet 5782, Firenze, 2022 
 Marion Sonnenfeld (editor), The World of Yesterday's Humanist Today. Proceedings of the Stefan Zweig Symposium, texts by Alberto Dines, Randolph J. Klawiter, Leo Spitzer and Harry Zohn, State University of New York Press, 1983
 
 Friderike Zweig, Stefan Zweig, Thomas Y. Crowell Co., 1946 (account of his life by his first wife)

External links 

 StefanZweig.org
 StefanZweig.de
 Stefan Zweig Centre Salzburg
 Home page, Casa Stefan Zweig
 "Stefan Zweig and Chess" by Edward Winter
 "No Exit", article on Zweig at Tablet Magazine
 "To Friends in Foreign Land" – Zweig's letter, which he published in the newspaper Berliner Tageblatt, on September 19, 1914
 Zweig's foreword to The World of Yesterday
 
 Guide to the Correspondence of Stefan Zweig and Siegmund Georg Warburg at the Leo Baeck Institute, New York

Libraries
 Zweig Music Collection at the British Library
 Stefan Zweig Collection at the Daniel A. Reed Library, State University of New York at Fredonia, Fredonia, New York
 Stefan Zweig Online Bibliography, a wiki hosted by Stefan Zweig Digital, in Salzburg, Austria
 Stefan Zweig's suicide letter on the National Library of Israel's website

Electronic editions
 
 
 
 

 
1881 births
1942 suicides
Austrian biographers
Male biographers
Austrian male dramatists and playwrights
German male dramatists and playwrights
20th-century German dramatists and playwrights

Austrian male novelists
Austrian exiles
Austrian expatriates in Brazil
20th-century Austrian novelists
German male novelists
Austrian refugees
Austro-Hungarian Jews
Austro-Hungarian writers
Barbiturates-related deaths
Drug-related suicides in Brazil
Exilliteratur writers
Jews who immigrated to the United Kingdom to escape Nazism
Jewish novelists
Jewish dramatists and playwrights
Joint suicides
People from Innere Stadt
Writers from Vienna
Anti-nationalism
20th-century biographers
20th-century Austrian dramatists and playwrights
20th-century Austrian journalists
Suicides by Jews during the Holocaust